Lac Vieux Desert Indian Reservation is an Indian reservation located in Watersmeet Township of southeastern Gogebic County, in the western part of Michigan's Upper Peninsula. It is the landbase for the Lac Vieux Desert Band of Lake Superior Chippewa. The reservation consists of two sections in eastern Watersmeet Township. There were 221 people living on the reservation in the 2020 census.

Demographics

2020 census
As of the census of 2020, the population of the Lac Vieux Desert Reservation was 221. The racial makeup of the reservation was 85.5% Native American, 6.8% White, 0.5% Black or African American, 1.4% from other races, and 5.9% from two or more races. Ethnically, the population was 1.4% Hispanic or Latino of any race. The 2020 census results may be inaccurate for places like the Lac Vieux Desert Reservation owing to the Census Bureau's implementation of differential privacy protections.

Of the total reservation population, 205 people were living on the northern section in the unincorporated community of Watersmeet, Michigan. Some 16 persons lived in the southern section located on the north shore of Lac Vieux Desert, on the Michigan-Wisconsin border.

2000 census
The 2000 census reported a total population of 135 residents. Most of the population lived in the  northern section in the unincorporated community of Watersmeet, near the junction of US routes 45 (US 45) and 2. Some 26 persons lived in the  southern section, which is located on the north shore of Lac Vieux Desert, on the Michigan-Wisconsin border.

References

External links
Official website for the Lac Vieux Desert Band

Ojibwe reserves and reservations
Anishinaabe reservations and tribal-areas in the United States
Native American tribes in Michigan
American Indian reservations in Michigan
Geography of Gogebic County, Michigan
1988 establishments in Michigan
Populated places established in 1988